Konvansyon Inite Demokratik (KID) is a populist political party in Haiti which originated in 1986.

References 

1986 establishments in Haiti
Populist parties
Political parties established in 1986
Political parties in Haiti